Stoyanka Mutafova (née StoyanKa Mutafova; ; 2 February 1922 – 6 December 2019) was a Bulgarian actress. During her career, she starred in over 53 theatrical plays and 25 films

Nicknamed Ms. Natural Disaster for a play she performed in and The Queen of Bulgarian comedy, she was an official applicant for a Guinness Book of World Record as the actress with the longest active professional career. At the age of 94 in 2016, she toured the theater halls in major cities of the United States, Canada, the Netherlands, Switzerland, Great Britain and Germany.

Biography
Born in Sofia, she graduated from University of Sofia with a degree in classical philology. Later, she studied acting in Bulgaria and Prague. From 1949 until 1956 she acted in multiple plays in the "Ivan Vazov" national theatre. She co-founded the Aleko Konstantinov Theatre, where she performed from 1957–91. In 2005, she starred alongside Georgi Kaloyanchev in the play The Astronauts.

She died at the age of 97 on December 6, 2019 as a result of sepsis and pneumonia, brought on by necrosis of the gallbladder.

Filmography
 Tochka parva (1956)
 Lyubimetz 13 (1958)
 Spetzialist po vsichko (1962) as the Hairdresser
 Dzhesi Dzeyms sreshtu Lokum Shekerov (1966) as Lokum's wife
 The Tied Up Balloon (1967)
 Byalata staya (1968) as Rina's Mother
 L'amante di Gramigna (1969)
 Whale (film) (1970) as Grandma Stoyna
 Ezop (1970) as Casandra
 Byagstvo v Ropotamo (1973) .... Gypsy 
 Nako, Dako and Tsako (1974)
 Temnata Koria (1977)
 Toplo (1978)
 Patilansko tsarstvo (1980)
 Bash maystorat nachalnik (1983)
 Naslednicata (1984)
 Bronzoviyat klyuch (1984) as Samsarova
 Federatziya na dinastronavtite (1984) - TV Series
 Pantudi (1993)
 Golemite igri (1999) .... Moni's Grandma
 Stakleni topcheta (1999) .... Albena's Mother
 Rapsodiya v byalo (2002) .... Old lady
 Sofia Residents in Excess (2011-2018) - TV Series

References

External links
 
 Stoyanka Mutafova's obituary 

1922 births
2019 deaths
20th-century Bulgarian actresses
21st-century Bulgarian actresses
Bulgarian film actresses
Bulgarian television actresses
Bulgarian stage actresses
Bulgarian atheists
Actresses from Sofia